WEC 14: Vengeance was a mixed martial arts event promoted by World Extreme Cagefighting on March 17, 2005, at the Tachi Palace Hotel & Casino in Lemoore, California. The Main Event saw John Polakowski take on Olaf Alfonso.

Results

See also 
 World Extreme Cagefighting
 List of World Extreme Cagefighting champions
 List of WEC events
 2005 in WEC

References

External links
 WEC 14 Results at Sherdog.com

World Extreme Cagefighting events
2005 in mixed martial arts
Mixed martial arts in California
Sports in Lemoore, California
2005 in sports in California